Ulla Ekblom (née Olsson on 19 May 1943) is a retired Swedish athlete. She was part of the 4 × 400 m relay team that finished sixth at the 1969 European Championships, setting a new national record. She won the national titles in the long jump (1965–66) and pentathlon (1966) and set several national records in the long jump.

References 

Swedish pentathletes
Swedish female long jumpers
Swedish female sprinters
1943 births
Living people